Rúben Diogo da Silva Neves (born 13 March 1997) is a Portuguese professional footballer who plays as a midfielder for the Portugal national team and is the captain of Premier League club Wolverhampton Wanderers.

Formed at Porto, where he made his first-team debut at the age of 17, he joined Wolverhampton Wanderers for a reported £15.8 million in 2017. He has made over 200 appearances in England, winning the EFL Championship in his first season.

Neves made more than 60 appearances for Portugal's youth national teams. He made his senior international debut for Portugal at the age of 18 in 2015, and was part of their squad at Euro 2020 and the 2022 World Cup.

Club career

Porto
Born in Mozelos (Santa Maria da Feira), Aveiro District, Neves grew up supporting FC Porto and joined the club's youth system at the age of eight. During his time with the academy, he also spent a season on loan at Padroense which acted as the under-16 team; on his time in the youth structures, reserve team manager Luís Castro described him as a player with "extraordinary mental qualities, to go along with technical and tactical skills".

Ahead of the 2014–15 season, Neves was earmarked to bypass Porto's under-19s and play with the reserves instead. Following an injury to teammate Mikel Agu, however, he was called by Julen Lopetegui to be part of the main squad's pre-season preparations. On 15 August 2014, aged 17 years and five months, he made his Primeira Liga debut where he started and scored in a 2–0 home win against Marítimo – in doing so, he became the youngest player in the club's history to score a goal in the competition. He played his first match in the UEFA Champions League five days later in a 1–0 win over Lille, and broke another record, previously held by Cristiano Ronaldo, by being the youngest Portuguese to appear in the tournament.

On 10 December 2014, during a Champions League group stage fixture against Shakhtar Donetsk, Neves suffered an injury to his right knee following a collision in midfield with Alex Teixeira. At the end of the game, the club explained that he suffered a sprain, with apparent damage to the internal lateral ligament. After spending nearly a month on the sidelines, he returned to the pitch in a 3–1 home win over União da Madeira in the Taça da Liga. Following his injury, his role in midfield was filled by Casemiro and he spent the majority of the remainder of the season behind the Brazilian in the pecking order.

On 20 October 2015, aged 18 years and 221 days, Neves became the youngest player to start as captain in the Champions League, helping Porto to a 2–0 win against Maccabi Tel Aviv in the group stage and surpassing previous record holder Rafael van der Vaart, who held it since 16 September 2003. On 5 December, in a 2–1 win over Paços de Ferreira also at the Estádio do Dragão, he broke another record by becoming the youngest player to make 50 appearances for the club, surpassing players like Fernando Gomes and Jaime Magalhães.

Wolverhampton Wanderers
On 8 July 2017, Neves signed for EFL Championship club Wolverhampton Wanderers for an undisclosed fee, believed to be in the region of £15.8 million – a club and league record fee. Upon joining, he was reunited with former Porto manager Nuno Espírito Santo. He scored his first goal on 15 August, in a 3–2 away win over Hull City. In April 2018, Neves was nominated for the EFL Championship Player of the Season and Young Player of the Season awards, and was also included in the Team of the Season along with teammates Conor Coady and John Ruddy. His team was ultimately promoted as champions with the player scoring 6 goals in 42 appearances, all of which were scored from outside of the box. At the conclusion of the season, he claimed a hat-trick of club awards as he walked away with the Player of the Season, Player's Player of the Season and Goal of the Season accolades. He was also awarded the EFL Goal of the Year award for 2018 for his goal against Derby County at Molineux on 11 April 2018.

Wolves announced that Neves had signed a new contract in July 2018, extending until June 2023. In the first match of the new season, he scored his first Premier League goal and assisted Raúl Jiménez in the latter's competitive debut, as his team twice came from behind to draw 2–2 against Everton. His appearance in the match, alongside compatriots Rui Patrício, João Moutinho, Diogo Jota and Hélder Costa, also saw the club break the league record for the most Portuguese players named in a starting line-up.

On 6 October 2018, Neves made his 50th appearance for Wolves and marked the occasion by contributing in the build-up for Matt Doherty's winning goal in a 1–0 victory over Crystal Palace. The following January, his 55th-minute winning goal against Liverpool at Molineux in the FA Cup, "a venomous dipping shot from  that beat Simon Mignolet at his near post", was voted the best goal of the third round by visitors to BBC Sport's website.

On 25 September 2019, Neves was made Wolves' club captain for the first time, when he led the team in the absence of regular captain Conor Coady as Wolves secured progression to the 2019–20 EFL Cup fourth round with a penalty shoot-out victory over Reading at Molineux in the third round. He made his 100th appearance in the Premier League in a goalless draw at Aston Villa on 6 March 2021. That May, it was revealed that his contract was in fact running until 2024.

Neves made his 200th competitive appearance for Wolves in all competitions in 2–0 win away to Tottenham Hotspur in the Premier League on 13 February 2022. On 13 March, his 25th birthday, he assisted the only goal by Coady in a victory at Everton that constituted Wolves's 1,000th win in top-flight football (over 67 seasons dating back to 1888) and also sealed the club's first league double over that opponent since 1972–73. Days later, his knee injury from the first half of a home game against Leeds United ruled him out for a month. He returned on 30 April against Brighton & Hove Albion, but was substituted at half-time.

In the first game of the 2022–23 season against Leeds United on 6 August 2022, Neves took the captain’s armband as Conor Coady was kept on the substitutes' bench. He was made Wolves’ captain on a full-time basis after the defender departed on loan to Everton. Neves scored his first goal of the season, and his twenty-fifth in a Wolves shirt, in a 1–1 Premier League draw with Newcastle United at Molineux on 28 August.

International career

Youth

Neves represented Portugal at the 2014 UEFA European Under-17 Championship, helping the country reach the semi-finals as captain. For his performances, he was named among the top ten talents of the tournament by a selection of UEFA reporters.

On 29 August 2014, still aged 17, Neves was called by coach Rui Jorge to be part of the under-21 team. He scored his first goal on 14 October in a 5–4 home win against the Netherlands in the play-off round of the 2015 UEFA European Under-21 Championship.

When the finals began in the Czech Republic, Neves broke a new record by becoming the youngest player to debut for the Portuguese under-21s in the tournament, aged 18 years and 3 months, playing five minutes to help beat England 1–0 in the group stage opener. It was his only appearance, as Portugal reached the final, which they lost to Sweden in a penalty shoot-out.

Senior
Neves was first called up to the senior team on 10 November 2015, ahead of friendlies against Russia and Luxembourg as an injury replacement for João Moutinho. He made his debut in the former match, featuring 17 minutes in the 1–0 loss in Krasnodar, before playing the entire 2–0 win against the latter at the Stade Josy Barthel, sharing the midfield with Porto teammates Danilo Pereira and André André.

Neves was selected by manager Fernando Santos for a preliminary 35-man squad for the 2018 FIFA World Cup, but did not make the final 23-man squad.

At the 2019 UEFA Nations League Finals on home soil, Neves played in the 3–1 semi-final win over Switzerland, but was dropped from the starting eleven for the final against the Netherlands for the more defensive Danilo. In that match at his former club ground the Dragão, he came on in added time for William Carvalho as the Portuguese won 1–0.

Neves was one of four Wolves players included in the Portugal squad for UEFA Euro 2020. He made his sole appearance in the delayed competition on 23 June, as a substitute in a 2–2 group draw with France in Budapest.

Neves was chosen for the 2022 FIFA World Cup in Qatar.

Style of play
An article on UEFA's website described Neves as a defensive midfielder who is not afraid to go forward and prompt attacks, showing great maturity combined with an accurate passing skill, great vision and an astute sense of positioning. His playing attributes also granted him comparisons to Portuguese international teammate João Moutinho for his fine first touch, similar desire to press his opponents and excellent distribution. Neves also drew praise in the media for his technical, tactical and mental qualities, as well as his intelligence and long-range shooting ability.

Career statistics

Club

International

Honours
Wolverhampton Wanderers
EFL Championship: 2017–18

Portugal U21
UEFA European Under-21 Championship runner-up: 2015

Portugal
UEFA Nations League: 2018–19

Individual
UEFA European Under-17 Championship Team of the Tournament: 2014
Confederação do Desporto de Portugal Young Prospect of the Year: 2015
EFL Championship Team of the Season: 2017–18
EFL Team of the Season: 2017–18
PFA Team of the Year: 2017–18 Championship

References

External links

Profile at the Wolverhampton Wanderers F.C. website

1997 births
Living people
Sportspeople from Santa Maria da Feira
Portuguese footballers
Association football midfielders
Padroense F.C. players
FC Porto B players
FC Porto players
Wolverhampton Wanderers F.C. players
Primeira Liga players
English Football League players
Premier League players
Portugal youth international footballers
Portugal under-21 international footballers
Portugal international footballers
UEFA Euro 2020 players
2022 FIFA World Cup players
UEFA Nations League-winning players
Portuguese expatriate footballers
Portuguese expatriate sportspeople in England
Expatriate footballers in England